Scarp may refer to:

Landforms and geology
 Cliff, a significant vertical, or near vertical, rock exposure
 Escarpment, a steep slope or long rock that occurs from erosion or faulting and separates two relatively level areas of differing elevations
 Fault scarp, the topographic expression of faulting attributed to the displacement of the land surface by movement along faults

Other
 Scarp, Scotland, an island in the Outer Hebrides of Scotland
 Scarp and counterscarp, the inner and outer sides of a ditch or moat used in fortifications
 SS-9 Scarp, the NATO reporting name for the R-36 ICBM
 Scarp, a 2013 book by the British writer Nick Papadimitriou

See also
 Scarpe (disambiguation)